Vitacea is a genus of moths in the family Sesiidae.

Species
Vitacea cupressi (Edwards, 1881)
Vitacea polistiformis (Harris, 1854)
Vitacea scepsiformis (Edwards, 1881)
Vitacea admiranda (Edwards, 1882)

References

Sesiidae